"Put You in the Picture" is a song written by Russell Webb, and performed by his group PVC2, who comprised Ure on guitar and lead vocals, Kenny Hyslop on drums, Billy McIsaac on keyboards and Webb on bass guitar. The song was released on 30 August 1977 by Zoom Records, in an eponymous EP, which was the last single and recording of Midge Ure with the remaining members of Slik, who later resurged as Zones, with another singer and guitarist, Willie Gardner.

In August 2006, Ryan Foley listed the single as #8 in his top 10 list of Scottish punk singles in Stylus Magazine. Foley declared that: "“Pain” is thundering and thrashy, and heavily inspired by contemporary acts such as the Clash. Ure's vocals on the chorus feature all the gusto of a medieval torturer, and are a far cry from the saccharine tunes he was doing just 18 months earlier" (in reference to Ure's vocal style in Slik).

PVC2 was a Scottish punk band who resurged from the ashes of one-time promising teenybop band Slik, whose songs were a very different repertoire, with the typical 1970s soft and glam rock and Bay City Rollers-like songs. From early to almost-late 1976, the band was very popular in Britain, but the emergence of punk stopped all the prominence of the bands who established some time ago. The Slik album was unsuccessful, like the last singles, released until 1977. That year, then bassist Jim McGinlay departed, and got replaced by Russell Webb, who recently dropped university in Glasgow. The band continued performing like Slik, but changed abruptly of style, naming themselves as PVC2 and beginning to play punk rock.

During the last days of Slik or the first of PVC2, Ure joined for brief time Rich Kids, band founded by original Sex Pistols bassist, Glen Matlock, but wasn't so interested and departed shortly afterwards to dedicate time to PVC2. After the release of the EP, Ure quit and moved to London to rejoin Rich Kids, re-recording the "Put You in the Picture" song in the album Ghosts of Princes in Towers, released in August 1978. Late that year, the band stopped, and split up officially in mid-1979, when Ure was recently an Ultravox member (he joined in April of that year).

Track list
"Put You in the Picture" (Russell Webb) on the original label the writer credits were mistakenly attributed to Midge Ure/Billy McIsaac)
"Pain" (Billy McIsaac)
"Deranged Demented & Free" (Kenny Hyslop)

References

External links
 the5uk.com - info on the Zones, Rich Kids, Slik, etc.
 punk77.co.uk - PVC2 info

1977 debut EPs
1977 singles
Songs written by Midge Ure
British punk rock songs